Ferenc Orbán (6 March 1904 – 9 July 1989) was a Hungarian athlete. He competed in the men's high jump at the 1928 Summer Olympics.

References

1904 births
1989 deaths
Athletes (track and field) at the 1928 Summer Olympics
Hungarian male high jumpers
Olympic athletes of Hungary
Place of birth missing